Santa Teresa may refer to:

People
One of several saints named Teresa
 Saint Teresa of Ávila
 Saint Teresa of Calcutta
 Saint Teresa of Los Andes
 Saint Teresa Benedicta of the Cross
 Saint Thérèse of Lisieux 
 Saint Teresa Margaret of the Sacred Heart
 Teresa Urrea also known as Santa Teresa

Places

Argentina
 Santa Teresa, Santa Fe, a town in the southern end of Santa Fe Province

Australia
 Santa Teresa, Northern Territory, a Catholic mission and Aboriginal community

Belize
 Santa Teresa, Belize, a village in Toledo District

Brazil
 Santa Teresa, Espírito Santo, Brazil
 Santa Teresa, Rio de Janeiro, a neighborhood in the city of Rio de Janeiro, Brazil

Costa Rica
 Santa Teresa, Costa Rica

Nicaragua
 Santa Teresa, Carazo

Peru
 Santa Teresa, near Aguas Calientes, Peru

United States
 Santa Teresa, New Mexico
 Santa Teresa, San Jose, California
 Santa Teresa (VTA), a light rail station in the neighborhood
 Santa Teresa Hills, a mountain range in the neighborhood
 Rancho Santa Teresa, a Mexican land grant which gives the neighborhood its name
 Santa Teresa High School, a public high school in the neighborhood

Uruguay
 Santa Teresa National Park, Rocha

Other uses
Fortaleza de Santa Teresa, a military fortification in Rocha, Uruguay
 Santa Teresa (fictional city), used in novels by Ross Macdonald, Sue Grafton and Roberto Bolaño
 Santa Teresa CD, a women's football club from Badajoz, Extremadura, Spain
 Santa Teresa dam, on the Spanish river Tormes
 Santa Teresa, the zanpakutō held by Nnoitra Jiruga in the Japanese manga series Bleach
"Santa Teresa", a track by guitarist Ed O'Brien

See also

 
 
 
 
 
 Teresa (disambiguation)
 Saint Teresa (disambiguation)
Sainte Thérèse (disambiguation)